Hyatts Creek is a stream in southwest Iron and northeast Reynolds counties in the U.S. state of Missouri. It is a tributary of the Black River.

The stream headwaters arise in Iron County approximately four miles northwest of the community of Sabula. It flows south-southeast for a distance of about 4.5 miles to its confluence with Black River approximately 5.5 miles southeast of Lesterville.

Hyatts Creek has the name of Seth Hyatt, a pioneer citizen.

See also
List of rivers of Missouri

References

Rivers of Iron County, Missouri
Rivers of Reynolds County, Missouri
Rivers of Missouri
Tributaries of the Black River (Arkansas–Missouri)